In mechanics, a micromixer is a device based on mechanical microparts used to mix fluids. This device represents a key technology to fields such as chemical industry, pharmaceutical industry, analytical chemistry, biochemical analysis, and high-throughput synthesis, since it makes use of the miniaturization of the fluids associated in the mixing to reduce quantities involved in the chemical and/or biochemical processes.

Types and Technology
There are two types of micromixers: passive and active.

Active mixers use an external energy source, either electric or magnetic, to perform the mixing of the fluids. Passive mixers have no power source and use pressure to guide the flow.

References

External links
Micromixers in Forschungszentrum Karlsruhe
Application of Micromixers in Smart Biosensors

Microtechnology
Microfluidics